Castianeira is a genus of ant-like corinnid sac spiders first described by Eugen von Keyserling in 1879. They are found in Eurasia, Africa, and the Americas, but are absent from Australia. Twenty-six species are native to North America, and at least twice as many are native to Mexico and Central America.

Description
Spiders of this genus have eight eyes in two procurved rows, the upper row slightly wider than the lower row. This distinguishes them from species of Micaria that almost always have straight rows of eyes. The opisthosoma is not constricted, and has an elongate to oval shape to mimic that of ants. In addition to the ant-like coloration, the abdomen has white scale-like setae. The rear pair of legs are the longest, and the front pair are second longest.

Mimicry
Some species mimic specific groups of ants, while others only have generic body modifications to look more ant-like, such as an elongated body or a carapace pattern that creates the illusion of a third body segment. Some mimic ant behavior as well, waving their front two legs as if they were antennae or bobbing their abdomen to look more ant-like. Certain species found in Texas mimic fire ants to prey on them, while some species use Batesian mimicry, appearing like velvet ants to take advantage of their aposematism in order to deter predators.

Ant mimicry
Known ant-spider mimicry:
C. cingulata – short carpenter ants
C. longipalpus – myrmicine or ponerine ants
C. memnonia – Pachycondyla obscuricornis Emery
C. rica – Atta sp, Odontomachus sp, and others
C. trilineata – reddish carpenter ants (Latreille)

Species
 it contains 127 species:

References

Further reading
 Cushing P.E. (1997). Myrmecomorphy and myrmecophily in spiders: a review. Fla. Entomol. 80:165–193. PDF

Corinnidae
Araneomorphae genera
Cosmopolitan spiders
Taxa named by Eugen von Keyserling